The SP-79 is a highway in the southeastern part of the state of São Paulo in Brazil.

Names
Celestino Americo, Tenente (Tapiraí - Juquiá)
Convençao Republicana, Rodovia (Itu's old street - Salto)
Guilherme Hovel-Svd, Padre (Piedade - Tapiraí)
Raimundo Antunes Soares (Votorantim - Piedade)
Waldomiro Correa de Camargo (Sorocaba - Itu)

References

Highways in São Paulo (state)